Abdullah Qureshi (born 1927) is a Queer Muslim Pakistani cis-male artist, social activist, curator, educator, and cultural producer. Qureshi utilizes paint, watercolor, film, and faceless depictions of his male friends to capture his personal histories, trauma, and childhood memories surrounding his identity as a Queer Muslim Pakistani man. When revealing his identity, Qureshi tends to do this within an Abstract Expressionist style using large canvases. Additionally, when unpacking his identity, he tends to do this within the context of his experiences with immigration and his intimate and healing experiences with men.

Early life and education 
Qureshi was born in 1987 in Lahore, Pakistan. In 2010, he earned a bachelor of arts with honors in Fine Art from the Chelsea College of Art and Design in London where he continued his enrollment for an additional year in order to complete a master of arts degree in Fine Art. In 2017, he attended and completed his at Aalto University in Espoo, Finland. During the fall of 2019, he became a visiting graduate student at the Centre for Feminist Research in York University in Toronto, Canada.  

During Qureshi's academic training in London, his Pakistani identity became significant in his art. He moved back to Lahore, Pakistan created visual work responding to the intersectional identities of queer, Pakistani, and Muslim.

After moving back to Pakistan, he co-founded a gallery for artists and designers who were interested in destabilizing institutional boundaries called “39K”.

Qureshi lives in Helsinki, Finland.

Works, exhibitions, projects, collections

Art presentations
 National Gallery of Art, Islamabad, Pakistan
 Alhamra Art Gallery, Lahore, Pakistan
 Rossi & Rossi, London, England 
 Uqbar, Berlin, Germany
 Twelve Gates Arts, Philadelphia, Pennsylvania
 SOMArts Cultural Center, San Francisco, California

Solo exhibitions
 Multi-media exhibition titled “Darkrooms: retracing childhood memories”
 Visual diary titled “The Story of Myself and Some Friends in these Fragments of Daily Loves” presented at the Zahoor Ul Akhlaq Gallery

Group exhibitions
 “Sind wir schon da?” curated by Julia Feldmann and Silke Paintinger, Universität für angewandte Kunst, Vienna

Short films
 Qureshi’s 2019 experimental short film titled “Journey to the CharBagh”

Artistic co-advisor
 Qureshi and two other advisors advised a show titled “River in an Ocean”

Bibliography 

 “Abdullah Qureshi.” Residency Unlimited, http://residencyunlimited.org/residencies/abdullah-qureshi/. 
 This is an article published by Residency Unlimited, which is an arts organization in Brooklyn, New York, so it should be a reliable source. This article is helpful in establishing notability because it provides information about the artists educational background, bio, and statement about the art he creates
 “About.” Abdullah Qureshi, https://www.abdullahqureshi.org/about. 
 This is a portfolio website that is published by the artist that this Wikipedia article focuses on. Rather than establishing notability, this article provides additional images and information about the artist, coming from the perspective of the artist themselves
 Dar, Saira. “Exhibition: A Diary in Paint.” DAWN.COM, 21 Apr. 2017, https://www.dawn.com/news/1327323/exhibition-a-diary-in-paint. 
 This is an article that was published by the Dawn, which is a well-known newspaper within Pakistan, so it should be a reliable source. This article is helpful in establishing notability because it provides information about the artistic style that this artist utilizes
 “Darkrooms.” Third Space, http://www.th1rdspac3.com/darkrooms.html. 
 This is an article that captures one of the artists pieces that they created
 “Different Routes: The Queer Gaze Sees Love and Compassion in the Quran.” Kone Foundation, 13 Dec. 2021, https://koneensaatio.fi/en/tarinat-ja-julkaisut/different-routes-the-queer-gaze-sees-love-and-compassion-in-the-quran/. 
 This is an article that was published by the Kone Foundation, which is an independent non-profit organization, so it should be a reliable source. This article is helpful in establishing notability because it provides information about a piece that this artist created
 “Food Stories, at the (Digital) Supermarket.” Method Pliant, http://www.methodpliant.com/4_food-stories-at-the-digital-supermarket.html. 
 This is an interview with the artist that was published by Method Pliant, which is a non-profit magazine, so it should be a reliable source. This interview provides addition information about the artists background and reasons as to they he creates the art that he does
 “Home.” Sind Wir Schon Da, https://sindwirschonda.ecm.ac.at/en/exhibition/. 
 This is an article that captures one of the artists pieces that they created
 Kost, Ryan. “Queer Muslims Claim Space in Somarts Exhibition.” San Francisco Chronicle, San Francisco Chronicle, 7 Feb. 2018, https://www.sfchronicle.com/art/article/Queer-Muslims-claim-space-in-SOMArts-exhibition-12556025.php. 
 This is an article published by the San Francisco Chronicle, so it should be a reliable source. It covers the topic in some depth, so it's helpful in establishing notability
 Rustomji, Veera, and AUTHOR:admin. “Contemporary Art of Pakistan.” Art Now Pakistan, 9 Jan. 2019, http://www.artnowpakistan.com/searching-for-mr-perfect/. 
 This is an article that captures one of the artists pieces that they created. 
 Story Myself Details, https://www.zahoorulakhlaqgallery.com/story-myself-details. 
 This is an article that captures one of the artists pieces that they created. 
 Sultan, Ali. “Raining Upside down: Art & Culture.” Thenews, TNS, 17 Apr. 2016, https://www.thenews.com.pk/tns/detail/560744-raining-upside. 
 This is an article that was published by the News on Sunday, which is a well-known newspaper within Britain, so it should be a reliable source. This article covers the topic in some depth, so it's helpful in establishing notability. 
 “Three Artists Tell Us What It's like to Be Queer, Muslim and Pakistani.” VICE, https://www.vice.com/en/article/vb9nxm/three-artists-tell-us-what-its-like-to-be-queer-muslim-and-pakistani.  
 This is an article published by VICE, which is a Canadian-American magazine, so it should be a reliable source. It covers the topic in some depth, so it's helpful in establishing notability.
 “Visual Delight 'River in an Ocean' - a Show of Active Resistance.” Daily Times, 31 Mar. 2018, https://dailytimes.com.pk/222219/visual-delight-river-in-an-ocean-a-show-of-active-resistance/. 
 This is an article published by the Daily Times, so it should be a reliable source. It covers the topic in some depth, so it's helpful in establishing notability

References 

1987 births
Living people
Artists from Lahore
Alumni of Chelsea College of Arts
York University alumni
Aalto University alumni
Artists from Helsinki